The 44th SİYAD Awards, presented by the Turkish Film Critics Association (SİYAD), honored the best Turkish films of 2011 and took place on , at the Cemal Resit Rey Concert Hall  in Istanbul, Turkey.

Awards and nominations

Best Film
 Winner: Once Upon a Time in Anatolia produced by Zeynep Özbatur Atakan
 Future Lasts Forever produced by Soner Alper and Ersin Celik
 Shadows and Faces produced by Önder Çakar, Sevil Demirci and Seren Yüce
 Press produced by Sedat Yılmaz
 Hair produced by Tayfun Pirselimoğlu, Veysel İpek and Rena Vougioukalou

Best Director
 Winner: Nuri Bilge Ceylan for Once Upon a Time in Anatolia
 Çağan Irmak for My Grandfather's People
 Tayfun Pirselimoğlu for Hair
 Ümit Ünal for Pomegranate
 Derviş Zaim for Shadows and Faces

Mahmut Tali Award for Best Script
 Winner: Ebru Ceylan, Nuri Bilge Ceylan and Ercan Kesal for Once Upon a Time in Anatolia
 Ümit Ünal for Pomegranate
 Tayfun Pirselimoğlu for Hair
 Sedat Yılmaz for Press
 Derviş Zaim for Shadows and Faces

Cahide Sonku Award for Best Actress
 Winner: Nazan Kesal for Hair
 Demet Akbağ for Eyyvah Eyvah 2
 Nesrin Cavadzade for Fire!
 Hazar Ergüçlü for Shadows and Faces
 Nergis Öztürk for Merry-Go-Round

Best Actor
 Winner: Ayberk Pekcan for Hair
 Taner Birsel for Once Upon a Time in Anatolia
 Serkan Ercan for Toll Booth
 Osman Sonant for Fire!
 Muhammet Uzuner for Once Upon a Time in Anatolia

Best Supporting Actress
 Winner: Asiye Dinçsoy for Press
 Popi Avraam for Shadows and Faces
 Gökçe Bahadır for My Grandfather's People
 İdil Fırat for Pomegranate
 Nergis Öztürk for Toll Booth

Best Supporting Actor
 Winner: Ercan Kesal for Once Upon a Time in Anatolia
 Rıza Akın for Hair
 Rıza Kocaoğlu for Losers' Club
 Fırat Tanış for Once Upon a Time in Anatolia
 Ahmet Mümtaz Taylan for Once Upon a Time in Anatolia

Best Cinematogropher
 Winner: Gökhan Tiryaki for Once Upon a Time in Anatolia
 Feza Çaldıran for Future Lasts Forever
 Emre Erkmen for Shadows and Faces
 Ercan Özkan for Hair
 Mehmet Zengin for Zephyr

Best Music
 Winner: Mircan Kaia for White as Snow
 Mustafa Biber for Future Lasts Forever
 Selim Demirdelen for Pomegranate
 Marios Takoushis for Shadows and Faces
 Cavit Ergün, Erdem Tarabuş and Can Göksu for Losers' Club

Best Editor
 Winner: Bora Gökşingöl and Nuri Bilge Ceylan for Once Upon a Time in Anatolia
 Haluk Arus for Losers' Club
 Çiçek Kahraman, Evren Luş and Tolga Karaçelik for Toll Booth
 Erdinç Özyurt for Hair
 Aylin Tinel for Shadows and Faces

Best Art Director
 Winner: Haluk Ünlü for My Grandfather's People
 Dilek Yapkuöz Ayatuna for Once Upon a Time in Anatolia
 Nevin Doğan for Press
 Elif Taşçıoğlu for Shadows and Faces
 Natali Yeres for Hair

Best Documentary Film
 Winner: Ekümenopolis: Ucu Olmayan Şehir directed by İmre Azem
 Anadolu'nun Son Göçerleri: Sarıkeçililer directed by Yüksel Aksu
 An directed by Nazlı Bayram
 Bedensiz Ruhlar directed by Sabite Kaya
 Bir Avuç Cesur İnsan directed by Rüya Köksal
 Diren-İş directed by Burak Koçak
 Ofsayt directed by Reyan Tuvi
 Ölücanlar directed by Murat Özçelik

Best Short Film
 Winner: Birgünbirgünbir...Evedegelmişkimseyok directed by Berrak Çolak
 Kırmızı Alarm directed by Emre Akay
 Pera Berbangê directed by Arin İnan Arslan
 Fazla Mesai directed by Gürcan Keltek
 Nolya directed by Cem Öztüfekçi

Honorary Awards
 Erden Kıral (filmmaker)
 Osman Şahin (screenwriter)
 Perihan Savaş (actress)

See also
 5th Yeşilçam Awards
 Turkish films of 2011
 2011 in film
 Best 10 Turkish Films selected by SIYAD

References

External links
  for SİYAD (Turkish)

2012 in Turkey
2011 film awards
Turkish film awards
January 2012 events in Turkey